The Blockheide is a protected area near Gmünd in northwestern Waldviertel in the Austrian state of Lower Austria. It is a varied heather landscape including meadows, mixed woods, small lakes and small fields.

It is famous for its far-flung giant granite blocks, among them some Rocking stones.

A nature park with the name Naturpark Blockheide-Eibenstein has been established in the area.

Literature 
 Verein "Naturpark Blockheide Eibenstein-Gmünd": 20 Jahre Naturpark Blockheide Eibenstein-Gmünd, 1984.

External links 

Geography of Lower Austria
Protected areas of Austria
Bohemian Massif
Parks in Austria